Louise Charlotte of Brandenburg (13 September 1617 – 28 August 1676), was a Duchess consort of Courland by marriage to Duke Jacob Kettler of Courland.

She was born to George William, Elector of Brandenburg and Elizabeth Charlotte of the Palatinate.

Life

Raised as a Calvinist, she practiced this faith all her life. In 1638 her family moved to Königsberg where she made contact with local group of poets led by Simon Dach. After Louise Charlotte reached maturity she received first marriage proposals. In total she was proposed to eight times. Among others were King of Poland Władysław IV. However, Louise Charlotte and her parents decided in favour of prince of Courland Jacob Kettler.

Courland
They married on 9 October 1645. A poem was composed for the wedding by Simon Dach. After the wedding the new couple moved to Goldingen and later to Mitau.

Louise Charlotte is attributed to have had a large influence over the policy of state during the reign of her consort. She worked with her brother in the interest of Brandenburg, but is also credited to have contributed to the greatness of Courland during her tenure.

She received several manors as a dowry, and administered them very wise and practically. She actively established gardens there and developed dairying. Also she was known as fair and kind landlord to her peasants.

When in 1657 Swedes invaded in Courland Louise Charlotte managed to receive a promise from Swedish general Jakob De la Gardie to spare her manors and peasants.

In 1658 she, together with Duke Jacob and all the family were kept as prisoners by the Swedes in Riga and later in Ivangorod. They were eventually released and were able to return to their duchy only in 1660, but all their properties and land was heavily devastated.

The negotiations between Brandenburg, Russia, Sweden and Poland took place in Mitau during her de facto reign.

Issue

References

1617 births
1676 deaths
17th-century Latvian people
Duchesses of Courland
Burials in the Ducal Crypt of the Jelgava Palace
17th-century Latvian women
Daughters of monarchs